Beltrán (Santiago del Estero) is a municipality and village in Santiago del Estero in Argentina.

History
There are archaeological deposits of the Mercedes and Averias cultures of the years 400 and 1100. They reveal the settlement of native peoples. The most studied and important areas include Vilmer, Beltran and Robles.

Population
Beltrán has a population of 5,321 according to the 2001 census, which represents and increase of 21.87% over the previous census in 1991 when the population was 4,366.

Economic activity
The main economic activities in Beltrán are livestock breeding, agriculture and forestry.

External links
 Geographical coordinates
 Provincial website
 Federal IFAM website

References

Populated places in Santiago del Estero Province